Lipovka is a rural locality (a selo) in Kazansky Selsoviet of Seryshevsky District, Amur Oblast, Russia. The population was 71 as of 2018. There is 1 street.

Geography 
Lipovka is located 14 km southwest of Seryshevo (the district's administrative centre) by road. Seryshevo is the nearest rural locality.

References 

Rural localities in Seryshevsky District